is a live video by Japanese singer/songwriter Chisato Moritaka. Recorded live at the Hitomi Memorial Hall in Setagaya, Tokyo on May 27 to 28, 2018, the video was released on May 22, 2019 by Warner Music Japan on Blu-ray and DVD formats, each offered with an optional photobook. In addition, RecoChoku offered limited edition releases of the video containing four CDs and an original poster. The video features Moritaka performing her 2012 compilation album The Singles in its entirety as the final stage of her 30th anniversary celebration.

The video peaked at No. 7 on Oricon's Blu-ray chart and at No. 9 on Oricon's DVD chart.

Track listing 
All lyrics are written by Chisato Moritaka, except where indicated.

Personnel 
 Chisato Moritaka – vocals, alto recorder
 Yuichi Takahashi – guitar
 Maria Suzuki – guitar
 Daisuke Sakurai – keyboards
 Masafumi Yokoyama – bass
 Toshiyuki Takao – drums

Charts

References

External links 
  (Chisato Moritaka)
  (Warner Music Japan)
 

2019 live albums
2019 video albums
Chisato Moritaka video albums
Japanese-language live albums
Japanese-language video albums
Live video albums
Warner Music Japan albums